Moorarie Station is a pastoral lease currently operating as a sheep station in the Murchison district of Western Australia's Mid West region.

It is watered by the southern branch of the Murchison River, the Hope River and the Yalgar River.

History

Moorarie was established by Edward William Butcher in 1875. Two years later Butcher sold the station to Dr James William Hope and his future father-in-law John Henry Monger. Hope operated the station with a sequence of partners, initially Alexander Crawford, later William Dalgety Moore, until 1891.

At the time there were 14,000 sheep, 250 cattle and 40 horses, with Aboriginal labour for shepherding, shearing and mustering.

William Kerr owned Moorarie from at least 1907 and held it until his death in 1936.

Floods

In April 1800 the Ord River was twelve miles wide near Moorarie, and the Murchison River was six miles wide in places. 

In March 1926 the property was isolated for a week by floods. One shepherd spent five days stuck up a tree before being rescued by a passerby who swam his horse two miles to reach him. At least 400 sheep were lost to floodwaters but workers saved another 400 by swimming them to higher ground over a period of two days.

See also
List of ranches and stations

References

Pastoral leases in Western Australia
Stations (Australian agriculture)
Mid West (Western Australia)
1875 establishments in Australia